Alice Blom (born April 7, 1980, in Oudeschild) is a volleyball player from the Netherlands, who plays as a spiker for Azerbaijani Igtisadchi Baku.

She was a member of the Dutch National Women's Team that won the gold medal at the FIVB World Grand Prix 2007 in Ningbo, PR China.

Awards

Individuals
 2008 Montreux Volley Masters "Best Receiver"

Clubs
 2009-10 Turkish League Championship -  Champion, with Fenerbahçe Acıbadem
 2009-10 Turkish Cup Championship -  Champion, with Fenerbahçe Acıbadem
 2009-10 Turkish Super Cup Championship -  Champion, with Fenerbahçe Acıbadem
 2009-10 Women's CEV Champions League runner up, with Fenerbahçe Acıbadem

References

External links
 
 

1980 births
Living people
People from Texel
Dutch women's volleyball players
Dutch expatriate sportspeople in Turkey
Fenerbahçe volleyballers
Igtisadchi Baku volleyball players
Dutch expatriate sportspeople in Azerbaijan
Expatriate volleyball players in Azerbaijan
Expatriate volleyball players in Turkey
Sportspeople from North Holland